The New Anticapitalist Party (abbreviated NPA) is a far-left political party in France founded in February 2009. The party launched with 9,200 members and was intended to unify the fractured movements of the French radical Left, and attract new activists drawing on the combined strength of far-left parties in the 2002 presidential elections, where they achieved 10.44% of the vote, and 7% in 2007 and 13% in 2012.

The party is closely associated with postal worker Olivier Besancenot, the main spokesman of the former strongest far left party, the Revolutionary Communist League (LCR). In May 2012, Myriam Martin supported the candidate of the Left Front, Jean-Luc Mélenchon in the 2012 presidential election against the candidate of the NPA, a worker and union activist at Ford's car plant in Bordeaux Philippe Poutou, who came eighth in the first round with 411,160 votes, 1.15% of the total votes. She left the NPA in July 2012.

Founding conference 
At the founding conference (6 to 8 February 2009), 630 delegates voted on a series of documents, which had gone through a long process of amendment and re-amendment in local and regional assemblies.

 The first document "Founding principles" detailed the party's analysis of the impasse of capitalism and the need for both mass mobilization, and, in the long term, the overthrowing of existing institutions.
 The second document was the provisional rulebook, which will remain in effect until the next conference.
 The third document was the Perspectives document, which attempted to set out priorities for the year ahead, and key demands to be pushed for in the immediate future.
 Finally, a document on the European elections expressed the attitude of the party towards the June European elections.

A number of contentious issues within the party, especially those relating to secularism, religion, and Islamophobia, were left open for further debate, leading to a number of difficulties and a tendency to devote considerable time and energy on internal debates, rather than activity. The party's name was originally intended to be temporary; a vote on the name was held at the founding congress, where NPA won over "Revolutionary Anticapitalist Party" (Parti anticapitaliste révolutionnaire) with 53% of the vote.

Structure 
Besancenot has stated that it has no single leader and is instead run collectively, being represented by elected spokespersons. The basic structure of the party is the local committee, which organises local activities. A National Political Council decides on general policy. Delegates to the Council are elected at the congress on a proportional basis, ensuring the representation of different tendencies or platforms.

Ideology 

The party's stated aim is to "build a new socialist, democratic perspective for the twenty-first century".

Olivier Besancenot has said that the party will be "the left that leads anticapitalist, internationalist, antiracist, ecologist, feminist struggles, opposing all forms of discrimination". The LCR's distinctive identification with Trotskyism was not continued by the NPA. Unlike in previous LCR documents, although feminism is very present, patriarchy theory is not mentioned. Such issues as the withdrawal of French troops from Afghanistan, a rise in the minimum wage and public services, however, are accepted by all members of the NPA.

The party's candidate for the 2022 French presidential election, Philippe Poutou, said in an interview for Franceinfo that he would amnesty all "political prisoners" if elected, such as members of the FLNC and ETA, and condemned France's "colonial attitude" in both Corsica and The Basque Country.

Alliances and splits 
Debate continues within the NPA about what sort of alliances with other groups are acceptable. The majority of militants emphasize the dangers of allying with forces which are likely to end up in joint local or national governments with the Socialist Party (PS). A minority believes there is work to be done in wide alliances with antiliberal parties of the left, such as the Party of the Left (PG).

In January 2009, the NPA signed a joint declaration with several other parties of the left, calling for the building of the 29 January national strike. A minority (16%) claimed that such unity in the strike movements means sufficient basis can be found for joint slates at the European elections, while the majority made a sharp distinction between alliances for social movements and electoral alliances. The party received 4.98% of the vote in the European election. Discussions were held in the course of 2009 with other parties to the left of the PS, concerning the possibility of joint slates for the regional elections in 2010. Finally, the NPA presented independent lists in a majority of regions, but joined the Left Front in three regions, and the Left Party in two others.

Since its foundation, the NPA has suffered a number of breakaways, and by the beginning of 2015 total membership had declined to 2,100, compared with 9,200 at the time of its Founding Conference in February 2009. In addition to the loss of individual members, three organised groups have left the party in order to join the Left Front: Gauche Unitaire in 2009, Convergences et Alternative in 2011, and the largest of the three, Anticapitalist left (Gauche Anticapitaliste) in July 2012. In addition, failure to reach the required level of support in the presidential and parliamentary elections has deprived the party of state funding, leading to a financial crisis. As a result of these setbacks, the NPA is engaged in an internal debate with the aim of refounding the party and reforming its internal structures. However, the NPA continues to be active in various social movements. It produces a weekly newspaper, Tout est à nous ! (originating as a slogan to be chanted on demonstrations, the name roughly translates as "Everything Belongs to Us!") and a monthly magazine of the same name.

In December 2013, the Revolutionary Marxists faction in the Fourth International declared the Anticapitalism and Revolution current in the NPA and criticized the reformist orientation of the party. In June 2021, almost 300 members of the Revolutionary Communist Current faction (Courante Communiste Révolutionnaire, CCR) left the party after being excluded from participating in the NPA congress and national conference, and the rejection of the pre-candidacy of CCR member Anasse Kazib as the NPA nominee for the 2022 French presidential election.

The NPA was in discussion to join the New Ecologic and Social People's Union (NUPES) for the 2022 French legislative election. After the PS joined the union, the NPA announced it would not enter the coalition due to insurmountable ideological differences with the PS; they also said they would support the coalition's more radical left-wing candidates.

In December 2022, the party, at the 5th congress, announced the departure of an un-specified group of people from many of the different splits and individual sectors inside the party. The new direction of the party follows "Platform B", an organisation plan aimed at being the framework of the future of the party, having gained 48% of the votes on the voted where other 2 alternative frameworks were proposed. It has been announced as of 11 December 2022 that the NPA's majority would follow the lead of the most prominent figures in the group, like Philippe Poutou, Olivier Besancenot, Christine Poupin and Pauline Salingue. The party has also announced a new meeting on 17 January 2023, aimed at clearing up some of the concerns regarding the future of the party and how exactly the split will affect its course.

Hijab controversy 
The NPA announced in February 2010 that it was fielding Ilham Moussaïd, a Muslim woman, as its candidate in Avignon for that year's regional elections. The party's decision was met with criticism from "across the political spectrum" in France, as Moussaïd wears a hijab (a headscarf worn by Muslim women) and the announcement came amidst a national debate regarding the wearing of hijabs in public areas. A few weeks prior to the announcement, the NPA denounced bans on hijabs as "Islamophobic and draconian". Tony Todd of France 24 described the party's decision to field Moussaïd as "radical pragmatism" aimed at securing votes from France's Muslim community.

Moussaïd describes herself as "feminist, secular, and veiled"; however, critics of Moussaïd argue that hijabs are an affront to women and incompatible with Moussaïd's values. In response, Moussaïd stated in March 2010:

Electoral results

Presidential

See also 
 Criticism of capitalism

Sources 
 "Le Nouveau parti anticapitaliste d'Olivier Besancenot est lancé", Agence France-Presse, 29 June 2008
 "'Le Nouveau Parti anticapitaliste ne doit pas être une LCR relookée'", Le Monde, 30 June 2008
 "Le Nouveau parti anticapitaliste, c'est parti", Radio France Internationale, 30 June 2008
 Interview (in English) of one activist by the Daily Maybe
 Ongoing coverage on the NPA in LINKS (in English)
 Anticapitalism and Revolution current in the NPA

References 

2009 establishments in France
Anti-capitalist political parties
Anti-globalization political parties
Alter-globalization
Eurosceptic parties in France
Far-left politics in France
Green political parties in France
Political parties established in 2009
Political parties of the French Fifth Republic
Socialist parties in France
Feminist parties
Socialist feminist organizations